National Highway 565 (NH 565), is a National Highway in India, which was formed as a new National Highway by up-gradation and passes through the state of Andhra Pradesh. It starts at Nakrekal of Telangana and ends at Yerpedu of Andhra Pradesh.

Route 

It starts at junction of National Highway 65 Nakrekal and passes through Nalgonda on the Nagarjuna Sagar road until Telangana border and then through Macherla, Yerragondapalem, Markapur, Chinarikatla junction (PODILI), Kanigiri, Pamur, Duttalur, Penchalakona, Rapur, and Venkatagiri before terminating at National Highway 71 at Yerpedu in Andhra Pradesh.

State–wise route length (in km):
Telangana – 
Andhra Pradesh – 

NHAI has taken up widening of this highway into two lane with paved shoulders throughout the stretch. Widening works were expected to be completed by the end of 2017.

Junctions  
Telangana
  Terminal near Nakirekal.
  near Haliya.
Andhra Pradesh
  near Pamur.
  at Duttalur.
  Terminal at Yerpedu.

See also 
 List of National Highways in Andhra Pradesh

References 

565
565
National highways in India